Sea Power: Naval Combat in the Missile Age or Sea Power is an upcoming video game under development by Triassic Games and slated to be published by MicroProse. One of the developers was also the former head developer of the Killerfish Games game Cold Waters in 2017. It is seen by many to be the spiritual successor to Jane's Fleet Command (1999). According to the developers, it is expected to be released in 2023.

Development 
Development began back in 2019 with Unity as the development tool being used. The game was announced in December of that year on the company's Facebook and Twitter pages. All developers are from different countries (Sweden, Germany and Poland respectively).

Gameplay 
The game is set in the Cold War between the 1960s and 80s, mainly focusing on Naval Combat between the NATO and the Warsaw Pact in the North Atlantic. The game is also slated to include the Gulf of Tonkin and the Persian Gulf. According to the developers, the gameplay style will be inspired by Janes's Fleet Command and EA's Strike Fleet. The game shares many features with Fleet Command including 3D graphics, real time gameplay, time compression and the inclusion of carrier and land based aircraft. The game will also use a turn-based style for the strategic map, although improved from their previous game with Killerfish Games, Atlantic Fleet.

References 

Cold War video games
Naval video games
Real-time strategy video games
Ship simulation games
Video games developed in Germany
Video games developed in Poland
Video games developed in Sweden

External links 

 Steam page
 Twitter page
 Facebook page
 YouTube channel
 Official website

See Also 

 Cold Waters

Upcoming video games scheduled for 2023